The 	Vaughn's Hall and Blacksmith Shop is a building in Montello, Wisconsin, United States, listed on the National Register of Historic Places.  The two-story cement block building was built by a blacksmith named John P. Vaughn in 1912.  The new cast concrete blocks were manufactured in Montello at Neck and Brothers manufacturing site.

The building was used as a blacksmith shop with a community hall upstairs.  The second floor grand opening ball on June 28, 1912 featured the Lyric Harp Orchestra.

Later, the building was used as a garage, a car dealership, a hardware store, and is now home of the Montello Museum.

In 2001, on the eve of demolition, Vaughn Hall was saved by a group of citizens dedicated to preserving Montello's history and a conscientious community who donated the building to the Montello Historic Preservation Society.

References

Blacksmith shops
Colonial Revival architecture in Wisconsin
1912 establishments in Wisconsin
National Register of Historic Places in Marquette County, Wisconsin